Walking on water is an example of a mythical superhuman task associated with some cultures. It may refer to:

 A Japanese myth about ninja, thought to be associated with Mizugumo.
 Jesus walking on water, in the Christian gospels
 Animal locomotion on the water surface

Walk on the Water, Walk on Water or Walking on Water may also refer to:

Film and television 
 Summer's End (film) or Walk on Water, 1999 film
 Walk on Water (film), 2004 Israeli film
 Walking on Water (2002 film), Australian film
 Walking on Water (2018 film), documentary film
 "Walk on Water" (Grey's Anatomy), 2007 episode of Grey's Anatomy

Music 
 Walk on Water (band), a Swedish contemporary Christian music band

Albums
 Walk on the Water (album), a 1980 album by Gerry Mulligan
 Walk on Water (Jerry Harrison album) (1990)
 Walk on Water (Katrina and the Waves album) (1997)
 Walk on Water (UFO album) (1995)

Songs
 "Walk on the Water", a 1968 song by Creedence Clearwater Revival on the band's eponymous album
 Walk on the Water (song), a 2009 song by Britt Nicole
"Walk on Water" (Aerosmith song) (1994)
"Walk on Water" (Basshunter song) (2009)
"Walk on Water" (Eddie Money song) (1988)
"Walk on Water" (Eminem song) (2017)
"Walk on Water" (Ira Losco song) (2016)
"Walk on Water" (Thirty Seconds to Mars song) (2017)
"Walk on Water", a 1972 song by Neil Diamond from Moods
"Walk on Water", a 1990 song by Dio from Lock Up the Wolves
"Walk on Water", a 1995 song by Audio Adrenaline from Bloom
"Walk on Water", a 1996 song by Ozzy Osbourne from the Beavis and Butt-Head Do America soundtrack
"Walk on Water", a 2000 song by Milk Inc. from Land Of The Living
"Walk on Water", a 2017 song by ASAP Mob from Cozy Tapes Vol. 2: Too Cozy
"Walk on Water", a 2015 song by Kat Dahlia from My Garden

See also
 Walk on the Water (disambiguation)